Edward Brayshaw (6 October 1863 – 20 November 1908) was an English international footballer, who played as a centre half.

Career
Born in Sheffield, Brayshaw played for The Wednesday and Grimsby Town and earned one cap for England in 1887.

References

External links

1863 births
1908 deaths
English footballers
England international footballers
Walkley F.C. players
Sheffield Wednesday F.C. players
Grimsby Town F.C. players
Footballers from Sheffield
English Football League players
Association football defenders
FA Cup Final players